Dynamica was a record label, founded by Jor and Anna Rosen after the success of Machinery Records specifically to release industrial metal music, hence the slogan Metal-Hacking-Industrialism.

Both labels later came under the Noise Records banner, a label of Modern Music Records, but still continued to release music under their own names. When Modern Music was acquired by the Sanctuary Records Group. the label Dynamica (and also Machinery) was officially dropped.

Artists at Dynamica
Ashtrayhead
Coptic Rain
Cubanate
Oomph!
Meathead
Second Skin
Templebeat
Think About Mutation

See also
 List of record labels
 Dynamica Drum Corps

Defunct record labels of Germany
Industrial record labels

de:Dynamica